Vance Rupert Huntley (June 10, 1911 – September 15, 1996) was a Canadian politician. He served in the Legislative Assembly of New Brunswick as member of the Progressive Conservative party from 1952 to 1956.

References

1911 births
1996 deaths
Progressive Conservative Party of New Brunswick MLAs